DLF Golf and Country Club is a country club situated in sector 42 Gurgaon, India, built and maintained by DLF Limited.

The club's championship golf course includes a new 18 hole designed by Gary Player and the original 9-hole designed by Arnold Palmer. This club has hosted many professional tournaments including the Johnnie Walker Classic, an event jointly sanctioned by the European and Asian Tours, in 2008 and the Hero Honda Indian Open, an Asian Tour event, in 2009. For three years starting in 2010 the club has hosted the Avantha Masters, a new Eurasia Golf Limited tournament co-sanctioned by the European, Asian and Indian tours.

References

External links

Golf clubs and courses in India
1999 establishments in Haryana
Sports venues completed in 1999
Sports venues in Haryana
Sport in Gurgaon
20th-century architecture in India